School of Design may refer to:

 Carnegie Mellon School of Design
 The School of Design, the organization that stages the annual New Orleans parade, Rex
 University of Pennsylvania School of Design
 Parsons The New School for Design
 South Australian School of Design, a predecessor of the School of Arts at the University of South Australia
 School of Design, Nanyang Polytechnic
PolyU School of Design

See also
 School of Art and Design (disambiguation)
 Hochschule für Gestaltung